The Women's 800 metre freestyle competition of the 2018 European Aquatics Championships was held on 3 and 4 August 2018.

Records
Before the competition, the existing world and championship records were as follows.

Results

Heats
The heats were started on 3 August at 11:23.

Final
The final was held on 4 August at 17:00.

References

Women's 800 metre freestyle